The 2016 U-19 Asia Rugby Championship is an international rugby union competition for Under 20 national teams in Asia. The winners will secure a berth at the 2017 World Rugby Under 20 Trophy.

Top division
The top division will be hosted by Malaysia from 11–17 December 2016.

Division 1

Division 1 was hosted by the Philippines at the International School Manila in Taguig from 14–17 December 2016. The winner was promoted to the top division.

References

2016 rugby union tournaments for national teams
2016 in Malaysian rugby union
2016 in Philippine sport
Sports in Metro Manila
rugby union
International rugby union competitions hosted by Malaysia
rugby union
2016 in Asian rugby union
Asia Rugby Championship